Inalienable or inalienability may refer to:

Inalienable right, a type of legal right in jurisprudence
Restraint on alienation
Inalienable possession, a class of nouns in linguistics
InAlienable, a 2008 science fiction film